Jag kan se en ängel is a jazz-inspired dansband song written by Johnny Thunqvist and Kaj Svenling. It was one of the entries for Melodifestivalen 1992, where it was performed by Lena Pålsson, back then singer of Wizex. The song started as number 10 out for the evening, and was knocked out in the first round. However, the song charted at Svensktoppen for two weeks between 19–26 April 1992, with positions 9-10. It was also released as a single in 1992.

References 

1992 singles
Melodifestivalen songs of 1992
Wizex songs
1992 songs